is a retired Japanese professional racing cyclist. After graduating from Josai University, Tashiro turned professional and rode in Europe and Asia, mostly for the Bridgestone Anchor team. He was twice national champion, and also represented Japan in the 2004 Summer Olympics. He retired in 2007. He is now an employee of Bridgestone.

Major results

2001
1st  Road race, National Road Championships
2002
1st Stage 5 Tour de Hokkaido 
2003
1st Prix d'Amourique 
2004
1st  Road race, National Road Championships
2005
1st Tour de Okinawa 
2006
 Tour de Taiwan
1st Stages 4 & 6

References

External links

1974 births
Living people
Josai University alumni
Japanese male cyclists
People from Tokyo
Olympic cyclists of Japan
Cyclists at the 2004 Summer Olympics